Defending champion Kei Nishikori successfully defended his title, defeating Pablo Andújar in the final, 6–4, 6–4, to win the singles title at the 2015 Barcelona Open.

Seeds
All seeds receive a bye into the second round.

Draw

Finals

Top half

Section 1

Section 2

Bottom half

Section 3

Section 4

Qualifying

Seeds

Qualifiers

Lucky losers

Qualifying draw

First qualifier

Second qualifier

Third qualifier

Fourth qualifier

Fifth qualifier

Sixth qualifier

References
 Main Draw
 Qualifying Draw

2015 ATP World Tour